Francis Newton Souza (12 April 1924 – 28 March 2002) was an Indian-American British Asian artist. He was a founding member of the Progressive Artists' Group of Bombay. Souza's style exhibited both decadence and primitivism.

Early life and education
Francis Newton Souza was born Francisco Victor Newton de Souza to Goan Catholic parents in the village of Saligão. After his father and then his elder sister passed away, he and his mother moved to Mumbai in 1929. Souza's mother remarried, and his half-brother was the painter Lancelot Ribeiro.

Souza attended St. Xavier's College in Bombay, but he was expelled in 1939 for drawing obscene graffiti in the restrooms.
He then studied at the Sir J. J. School of Art in Bombay but was also expelled from that school in 1945, because of pulling down the Union Jack flag during a school ceremony and participating in the Quit India Movement.
Souza joined the Communist Party of India soon after, and co-founded the Bombay Progressive Artists' Group in 1947.

Career
In 1948, Souza's paintings were shown in London's Burlington House as part of an exhibition on Indian Art. However, his work was attacked by the Goan community in Mumbai during an exhibition at Chemould Frames. Souza emigrated to London in 1949, following several complaints against him to the police from the Indian public for obscenity.

He initially struggled to make an impact as an artist in the UK. His Goan wife Maria took on multiple jobs in order to support their family. The Institute of Contemporary Arts included his work in a 1954 exhibition.

His success as an artist took off following the publication in 1955 of his autobiographical essay Nirvana of a Maggot in Stephen Spender's Encounter magazine. Spender introduced Souza to the art dealer Victor Musgrave.  Souza's 1955 exhibit at Musgrave's Gallery One sold out, leading to ongoing success. Souza was one of five artists on the UK shortlist for the 1958 Guggenheim International Award for his 1955 painting Birth.

In 1959, Souza published his autobiographical Words and Lines.

Souza's career developed steadily, and he participated in several shows, receiving positive reviews from John Berger. According to Berger, Souza's style "was deliberately eclectic: essentially Expressionist in character", but "also drawing on the post-war Art Brut movement and elements of British Neo-romanticism".

Reputation
The renowned Indian artist, M.F. Husain, recognized F. N. Souza as his mentor. In recent years, Souza's paintings have been sold for over a million dollars. His painting Birth (1955) depicting his mistress Liselotte posing naked while pregnant with their first daughter Keren, set a world auction record in 2008 for the most expensive "Indian" painting sold till then when it was purchased by Tina Ambani for US$2.5 million (Rs 11.3 crore) at a Christie's auction. In 2015, the painting Birth was resold to Kiran Nadar at Christie's in New York, fetching more than US$4 million.

In June 2010 Christie's held an auction of over 140 lots from the Souza estate. Many of Souza's works fetched very high prices, some several times Christie's estimates.

At an auction of Souza's painting The Last Supper (1990) held by Sotheby's in 2019, his former muse and fellow artist Nimisha Sharma interrupted the auction after the bidding had ended. She asked repeatedly who was the artist’s “+” in his signature for that painting. Observers later speculated it was her way of telling the art world that she had painted it along with him.

Personal life
Souza met a Goan fashion designer named Maria Figueiredo in 1945, they married soon after and had a daughter together. In 1954 Souza met Liselotte Kristian (also surnamed Kohn, 1919–1990), a married Jewish actress and Progressive League member, who became his mistress. They had three daughters together but they never got married: Souza remained married to Maria, while Liselotte remained married to her husband Richard. They also aborted a pregnancy in 1959, Souza thereby being automatically excommunicated from the Catholic Church.

Souza's relationship with Liselotte ended in 1961, with Liselotte alleging domestic violence. He divorced Maria in 1964 in order to marry the 16-year-old Barbara Zinkant. He and Barbara moved to New York City in 1967 and their son was born in 1971. Barbara divorced Souza in 1977 in order to marry her lover.

Souza divided his time between India and the United States after his second divorce. He had several mistresses (including a married young woman from Bombay) and visited several red light districts. The Indian artist and poet Srimati Lal was his mistress from 1993 until his death.

Souza's eldest daughter by his mistress Liselotte Kristian is the British-Israeli painter Karen (Keren) Souza-Kohn. Karen's son is the British-Israeli street artist Solomon Souza, known best for his murals in the Mahane Yehuda Market. Anya Souza, his youngest daughter by Liselotte, was born with Down Syndrome and is a trustee of the Down Syndrome Association, known for speaking out against the 2003 International Down Syndrome Screening Conference at Regents College in London.

F. N. Souza died on 28 March 2002 from a heart attack and was buried in Sewri Christian Cemetery in Mumbai. Only a few people attended the funeral, none of them family members or members of Souza's Goan community.

Public collections
Birmingham Museum of Art, UK
British Museum, London, UK
Glenbarra Art Museum, Himeji, Hyōgo, Japan
Haifa Museum, Israel
National Gallery of Modern Art, New Delhi, India
National Gallery of Victoria, Melbourne, Australia
Tate Gallery, London, UK
Progressive Art Gallery, New Delhi, India
Victoria and Albert Museum, London, UK
The Hepworth Wakefield Art Gallery, UK
Museum of Biblical Art (Dallas), Texas, USA

See also
 Lancelot Ribeiro (brother and fellow painter)
 Vamona Navelcar
 Vasudeo S. Gaitonde

References

External links

 (website on Souza by art critic Srimati Lal)

Indian male painters
Indian erotic artists
1924 births
2002 deaths
Indian emigrants to the United States
St. Xavier's College, Mumbai alumni
Sir Jamsetjee Jeejebhoy School of Art alumni
People from North Goa district
Souza, Francis, Newton
20th-century Indian painters
Indian Expressionist painters
Painters from Goa
Indian emigrants to the United Kingdom
20th-century Indian male artists
21st-century Indian male artists